Roel Dijkstra is a Dutch comic book series about a fictional football player. The series was created in 1975  by Jan Steeman (1933-2018; winner of the 2005 Dutch Stripschapprijs) and Andrew Brandt. The first 21 volumes, drawn by Steeman and his successors, were published between 1977 and 1995 by Dutch publisher Oberon. Steeman and Brandt produced the first ten.

Background
The eponymous Roel Dijkstra is a Dutch football player inspired by Johan Cruijff. He started out as a player with the local football club "FC Leidrecht", then moved on to "FC Hadfort" in the United Kingdom, "FC Union" in Corsica, and then "FC Rapiditas" in Spain  before returning to "FC LeIdrecht". The story revolves around Dijkstra and his difficulties adjusting to life in a foreign country, shifty club bosses, friendship with fellow players, and football championships.
 
In 2017 and 2018 two more volumes were released, Thuisfront (Homefront) and Pamplona,. Both were serialised in the revived Eppo-magazine.

Titles

References 

Dutch comic strips
Dijkstra, Roel
1975 comics debuts
Dijkstra, Roel
Dijkstra, Roel
Dijkstra, Roel
Comics set in the Netherlands
Association football comics
Drama comics
Dijkstra, Roel